Río Sábalo is a corregimiento in Sambú District, Comarca Emberá, Panama with a population of 12,881 as of 2010. It was created by Law 22 of November 8, 1983. Its population as of 1990 was 1,479; its population as of 2000 was 1,417.

References

Corregimientos of Comarca Emberá-Wounaan